Agriculture in the United Arab Emirates, including fishing, was a minor part of the UAE economy in the early 1990s, contributing less than 4 percent of GDP. Since the formation of the UAE, the availability of capital and the demand for fresh produce have encouraged agricultural development. The main farming areas are Digdaga in Ras al-Khaimah. Falaj al Mualla in Umm al Qawain, Wadi adh Dhayd in Sharjah, Al Awir in Dubai and the coastal area of Al Fujairah. Total cultivable land was around 70,000 hectares as of the early 1990s.

Most of the UAE's cultivated land is taken up by date palms, which in the early 1990s numbered about 4 million. They are cultivated in the arc of small oasis that constitute the Al Liwa Oasis. Both federal and emirate governments provide incentives to farmers. For example, the government offers a 50 percent subsidies on fertilizers, seeds, and pesticides. It also provides loans for machinery and technical assistance. The emirates have forty-one agricultural extension units as well as several experimental farms and agricultural research stations. The number of farmers rose from about 4,000 in the early 1970s to 18,265 in 1988.

Lack of ploughed land, intense heat, periodic locust swarms, and limited water supplies are the main obstacles to agriculture. The drive to increase the area under cultivation has resulted in the rapid depletion of underground aquifers, resulting in precipitous drops in water tables and serious increases in soil and water salinity in some areas. As a result, several farms have been forced to cease production. Despite the creation in 1983 of a federal authority to control drilling for water, development pressures in the 1980s and 1990s increased the exploitation of underground water supplies.

Between 1979 and 1985, agricultural production increased sixfold. Nevertheless, the UAE imported about 70 percent of its food requirements in the early 1990s. The major vegetable crops, supplying nearly all the country's needs during the season, are tomatoes, cabbage, eggplant, squash, and cauliflower. Ras al-Khaimah produces most of the country's vegetables. In addition to dates, the major fruit crops are citrus and mangoes. A vegetable canning facility in Al Ain has a processing capacity of 120 tons per day.

Poultry farms provided 70 percent of local requirements for eggs and 45 percent of poultry meat needed in 1989. Local dairies produced more than 73,000 tons of milk in 1991, meeting 92 percent of domestic demand.

Considerable revenues have been devoted to forestation, public landscaping, and parks. Trees and shrubs are distributed free to schools, government afforestation companies receive contracts to plant plots in the range of 200 to 300 hectares. The goals are to improve the appearance of public places as well as to prevent the desertification process in vulnerable agricultural areas. Many private farms have also increased around the Dhaid area of Sharjah. Although small, these private farms amount considerably to the green cover in the emirates.

Fishing

The government has supported traditional fishing in the rich waters off the UAE, an activity that has provided a livelihood for centuries along the coast. The government offers a 50 percent subsidy on fishing boats and equipment and has opened marine workshops that offer free repair and maintenance. Cooperatives assist fishermen in marketing their catch. The number of fishermen rose from 4,000 in 1980 to 10,611 in 1990. The total catch in 1989 of 91,160 tons (up from 70,075 tons in 1982) supplied most local demand. Moreover, prawns and fish are raised in fish farms at the National Mariculture Center, operated with Japanese assistance, in Umm al-Quwain.  hi bob

References